The Lex Talionis Fraternitas, Inc. (Sodalitas Ducum Futurorum), commonly known as Lex Talionis, is an exclusive fraternal organization of Filipino jurists, legal practitioners, and law students founded on September 28, 1969, at the San Beda College of Law. A chapter in the Ateneo de Davao University School of Law was established in 1974. In 1983, the Securities and Exchange Commission granted the incorporation of the fraternity.

Recruitment is by invitation only and exclusive to law students enrolled either at the San Beda College of Law or the Ateneo de Davao College of Law.

Name 
The fraternity takes its name from Lex Talionis, which is Latin for "law of retaliation". This concept is derived from the Mosaic law "an eye for an eye; a tooth for a tooth" which is a variation of the original concept promulgated under the Code of Hammurabi.

The secondary name, Sodalitas Ducum Futurorum is Latin for "solidarity of future leaders."

Organization

The head of the fraternity is called the Grand Judex. He is selected in secret by all members present in an election called for such a purpose.

Upon its establishment in 1969, the founders agreed that there would be no single Grand Judex during the formative year of the fraternity. Since there was no single Grand Judex, the first batch was headed by three co-equal Grand Judexes collectively called the Troika, composed of Miguel Soriano, Rizal Guerrero, and Jose Mendoza.

Later on, Francisco Acosta, was elected as the first Grand Judex.

The Grand Judex is assisted by a Vice Grand Judex, a Judex of Initiation, a Judex of War, a Judex for Academic Operations, and Exchequer, and a Keeper of the Scroll. A senior advisory body, the Council of Grand Judexes, likewise takes an active part in the affairs of the fraternity and acts as the corporate Board of Directors. The council is composed of past Grand Judexes, and is headed by a chairman, who acts as the main adviser to the current Grand Judex. The current chairman is Justice Francisco Acosta.

History 
The Lex Talionis Fraternitas was founded on September 29, 1969 by 35 students of the San Beda College of Law.

Policarpio Martinez and six other founders were requested to write the draft of the fraternity's constitution and by-laws. After a brief debate, the founders approved the document and sealed it with a sprinkling of beer in the afternoon of September 28, 1969 at the members' favorite bar near San Beda. Martinez was also tasked to take custody of the document.

One of the salient features of the constitution and by-laws was the Troika. It was decreed that the fraternity be ruled by a triumvirate of Grand Judexes. Miguel Soriano, Rizal Guerrero, and Jose Mendoza were unanimously elected and proclaimed as the first Grand Judexes of the Troika of the Lex Talionis Fraternitas. After a year, the triumvirate of Grand Judexes decided to scrap the constitution and by-laws. They also abolished the Troika for faster and easier manageability of the fraternity. Their decision was overwhelmingly endorsed by the members in a meeting that was called for the purpose. Since then, only a single Grand Judex is elected for a fixed term.

In 1974, a chapter in Davao City was founded by Joel Babista, Rodrigo Duterte, and Alberto Sipaco Jr. in Ateneo de Davao College of Law. The three are also known as the "Triumvirate." From then on, another Grand Judex was periodically elected by the members from the Ateneo de Davao College of law. The Grand Judex for the Ateneo de Davao chapter is coequal to that of the Grand Judex for the San Beda chapter. Each Grand Judex exercises absolute authority over their respective chapters.

Controversies

Death of Raul Camaligan 
On September 8, 1991, fraternity neophyte Raul Camaligan died of physical injuries sutained from initiation rites with Lex Talionis. Records of the criminal case show Camaligan, along with three other freshmen from the San Beda College of Law, were recruited with the assurance that hazing will not be required for full membership.

Eight members were indicted for homicide before the Regional Trial Court of Quezon City. Upon rearraignment, they withdrew their earlier plea of not guilty and pleaded guilty to the lesser offense of reckless imprudence resulting in homicide, effectively lowering the penalty to a minimum of two years and a maximum of four. The Grand Judex at that time, Roger Madamba, while not present during Camaligan's initiation, also admitted to the offense. The members were convicted, but later on applied for and were granted probation.

One of the convicted members, Rufino Quitasol Jr., fled the country without serving his sentence.

In three separate landmark cases, the Supreme Court allowed the members involved in Camaligan's death to take the bar examinations, take the lawyer's oath, and engage in the practice of law. In granting these petitions, the Court took judicial notice of "the general tendency of youth to be rash, temerarious and uncalculating." Additionally, the petitioners submitted evidence that a scholarship foundation in honor of Raul Camaligan was established in 1995 by the fraternity members.

However in 2017, an investigation by the Philippine Daily Inquirer revealed that no such foundation was ever established and no scholars were registered under its name, according to the records of San Beda Colllege. Gilbert Camaligan, Raul's father, further condemned the fraternity's silence after 25 years, and claimed the organization is "not a good example for young people."

Appointments under the Duterte administration 
During the presidency of Rodrigo Duterte, a disproportionate number of fraternity members were appointed to key government positions, prompting concerns of political favoritism and nepotism from political watchdogs and civil society groups. Within the first year of Duterte's presidency, 25 members of Lex Talionis held key positions in the government, up from just two during the previous administration.

In 2021, Duterte admitted the appointments were motivated by utang na loob (debt of gratitude), but defended his decisions by claiming he has the executive prerogative to appoint people he "know[s] and trust[s], just like other presidents before me."

Notable members 

 Vitaliano Aguirre II, former Secretary of Justice
 Adnan Alonto, ambassador to the Saudi Arabia for the Philippines
 Emil Aquino, commissioner, Securities and Exchange Commission
 Arthur Amansec, Social Security System commissioner
 Al Caparros Argosino, former Bureau of Immigrations commissioner, convicted of plunder in 2021
 Rodrigo Duterte, 16th President of the Philippines
 Erwin Enad, commissioner, Professional Regulation Commission
 Jacinto Fajardo Jr., associate justice of the Court of Appeals of the Philippines
 Dennis Funa, commissioner, Insurance Commission
 Dante Gierran, president-CEO, PhilHealth
 Antonio Kho Jr., associate justice of the Supreme Court
 Thomas Lajom III, director of the Subic Bay Metropolitan Authority
 Jose Catral Mendoza, retired associate justice of the Supreme Court
 Bienvenido L. Reyes, retired associate justice of the Supreme Court
 Michael Robles, former Bureau of Immigrations commissioner, convicted of plunder in 2021
 Gregory S. Ong, retired associate justice of the Sandiganbayan
Roy Señeres, former congressman and chairman of National Labor Relations Commission
Alberto Sipaco Jr, CEO and chairman, Philippine Mining Development Corporation
Mel John Verzosa, deputy administrator of the National Tobacco Administration

References

Student societies in the Philippines
Legal fraternities and sororities in the Philippines
Student organizations established in 1969
1969 establishments in the Philippines